Nationality words link to articles with information on the nation's poetry or literature (for instance, Irish or France).

Events
 March 25 — The University of Oxford expels the first-year undergraduate Percy Bysshe Shelley after he and Thomas Jefferson Hogg refuse to answer questions about The Necessity of Atheism, a pamphlet they published anonymously. Earlier this year, Shelley, as "A Gentleman of the University of Oxford", published in London Poetical Essay on the Existing State of Things, containing a 172-line anti-monarchical and anti-war poem dedicated to Harriet Westbrook, a work subsequently lost until 2006.
 November 21 — German poet Heinrich von Kleist shoots his terminally-ill lover Henriette Vogel and then himself, on the shore of the Kleiner Wannsee near Potsdam.

Lord Byron
 July 14–17 — Lord Byron arrives in London after an absence from England of a little more than two years on his Continental tour.
 October 16 — Byron receives a challenge from the poet Thomas Moore who had been offended by parts of English Bards.
 November 4 — Byron meets Thomas Campbell and Moore at the home of Samuel Rogers, where the company discusses literary topics.

Works published

United Kingdom
 Robert Bloomfield, The Banks of Wye
 Richard Cumberland, Retrospection
 Charles Lamb, Prince Dorus; or, Flattery Put Out of Countenance, published anonymously; for children
 Mary Russell Mitford, Christina, the Maid of the South Seas
 William Peebles, Burnomania: the celebrity of Robert Burns considered in a Discourse addressed to all real Christians of every Denomination
 Anna Maria Porter, Ballad Romances, and Other Poems
 Sir Walter Scott, The Vision of Don Roderick
 Mary Tighe, Psyche, with Other Poems
 John Wolcot, Carlton House Fete; or, The Disappointed Bard

United States
 Hugh Henry Brackenridge, An Epistle to Walter Scott, Pittsburgh: Franklin Head Printing-office
 William Cullen Bryant, Thanatopsis
 John Cole, editor, The Minstrel: A Collection of Celebrated Songs Set to Music
 Sumner Lincoln Fairfield, The Poems and Prose Writings of Sumner Lincoln Fairfield, two volumes, Philadelphia: Printed for the Proprietor
 Susanna Haswell Rowson, editor, A Present For Young Ladies; Containing Poems, Dialogues, Addresses, &c. &c. &c, As Recited by the Pupils of Mrs. Rowson's Academy, at the Annual Exhibitions, (Boston: Published by John West & Co.
 Samuel Woodworth, 1785-1842 [1811], Beasts at Law, or Zoologian Jurisprudence; A Poem, Satirical, Allegorical, and Moral, In Three Cantos, Translated from the Arabic of Sampfilius Philoerin, Z. Y. X. W. &c. &c. Whose Fables Have Made So Much Noise in the East, and Whose Fame Has Eclipsed That of Aesop. With Notes and Annotations New York: J. Harmer & Co.

Other
 Bernhard Severin Ingemann, Digte ("Poems"), Denmark

Births
Death years link to the corresponding "[year] in poetry" article:
 February 1 – Arthur Hallam (died 1833), English poet, best known as the subject of In Memoriam A.H.H. a long poem by his best friend, Alfred, Lord Tennyson
 October 19 – Andreas Munch (died 1884), Norwegian poet
 date not known – Andreas Laskaratos Ανδρέας Λασκαράτος (died 1901), Greek satirical poet and writer

Deaths
Birth years link to the corresponding "[year] in poetry" article:
 January 8 – Christoph Friedrich Nicolai (born 1733), German writer, publisher, critic, author of satirical novels, regional historian, and a key figure of the Enlightenment in Berlin
 March 12 – Judah Leib Ben-Ze'ev (born 1764), Galician Hebrew philologist, lexicographer, Biblical scholar and poet
 April 7 – Dositej Obradović (born 1742), Serbian author, philosopher, linguist, polyglot and the first minister of education of Serbia
 August 28 – John Leyden (born 1775), Scottish indologist and poet
 September 14 – James Grahame (born 1765), Scottish poet, lawyer and clergyman
 September 30 – Thomas Percy (born 1729), English bishop of Dromore, ballad collector and poet
 November 13 – Robert Treat Paine, Jr. (born 1773), American poet and editor; son of Robert Treat Paine, signer of the Declaration of Independence

See also

 Poetry
 List of years in poetry
 List of years in literature
 19th century in literature
 19th century in poetry
 Romantic poetry
 Golden Age of Russian Poetry (1800–1850)
 Weimar Classicism period in Germany, commonly considered to have begun in 1788  and to have ended either in 1805, with the death of Friedrich Schiller, or 1832, with the death of Goethe
 List of poets

Notes

Poetry
19th-century poetry